Cheshmeh Sabz-e Sofla (also Romanized as Cheshmeh Sabz-e Soflá; also known as Chashmeh-ye Sabz, Cheshmeh Sabz, Cheshmeh Sabz Gholi, and Cheshmeh-ye Sabz) is a village in Kuh Panj Rural District, in the Central District of Bardsir County, Kerman Province, Iran. At the 2006 census, its population was 23, in 6 families.

References 

Populated places in Bardsir County